Morphini is a tribe of nymphalid butterflies in the subfamily Morphinae.

Classification

Listed alphabetically:

Subtribe Antirrheina:
Antirrhea Hübner, [1822]
Caerois Hübner, [1819]
Subtribe Morphina:
Morpho Fabricius, 1807

References

Butterfly tribes